Charlotte Ellertson (March 2, 1966 – March 21, 2004) was named one of 50 most influential people in women's health. She is a key reason women achieved “the regulatory, clinical, and policy changes that made these methods more widely available to women around the world”.

Early life and education 
Charlotte Ellertson was born in Johannesburg, South Africa in 1966. At the age of 13, Ellertson moved to the United States with her family. Growing up in South Africa, Ellertson was exposed to women's health issues at an early age. Seeing this and women's health issues in the United States prompted Ellertson to want to change women's health.

Ellertson studied Biological Anthropology at Harvard University. Then she attended Princeton University and received her MPA and PhD in 1993 in Demography and Public Affairs from Princeton's Woodrow Wilson School of Public and International Affairs.

Career

Social work 
Ellertson became interested in women's health through her background of growing up in South Africa. She realized that many women around the world were unable to make their own decisions about their own health and bodies, so she decided to make a career out of this passion. During this time, no laws that protected women in making health-related decisions were present, and Ellertson took action in providing the opportunities for women to receive the proper health-care services and needs they deserve. In 2002, she founded Ibis Reproductive Health to change what women's health services were worldwide.

Charlotte Ellertson worked on the Population Council for seven years. She then worked as the Director of Reproductive Health for Latin America and the Caribbean in Mexico City for the final four years. Ellertson had many published articles, books, and reports and concentrating on emergency contraception and medical abortion. Ellertson was named one of 50 most influential women in health by the Huffington Post, and was profiled in the United Nations Population Fund's 2019 tribute to changemakers in sexual and reproductive health and rights.

Ibis Reproductive Health 
Founded in 2002, Ibis Reproductive Health is a nonprofit international women's reproductive rights research and advocacy organization. The organization was started out of the basement of a Cambridge, Massachusetts church by a team of three individuals, and has grown to over 30 people working in Cambridge, San Francisco, and Johannesburg. The nonprofit "focuses on increasing access to safe abortion, expanding contraceptive access and choices, and integrating HIV and comprehensive sexual and reproductive health services."

Projects of Ibis include:

 Free the Pill, previously called "Oral Contraceptives Over-the-Counter Working Group", is a coalition of health, rights, justice, and regulatory organizations and experts to bring birth control pills over the counter (OTC) in the United States, accessible to people of all ages.

 MedicationAbortion.com is a multilingual website run in partnership with nonprofit Cambridge Reproductive Health Consultants which provides medically accurate and evidence-based information about medication abortion.

 The Later Abortion Initiative is a project "to develop an ambitious agenda to preserve access to high-quality later abortion care and promote legislative and service delivery advances to improve pregnant people's access to care and to change the conversation around later abortion and the clients who need this service."

Personal life 
Ellertson knew how to speak several languages, (including Afrikaans, English, and Spanish) played the viola, and was a talented cook among many other things. Ellertson passed away at the age of 38 due to breast cancer. She married Paull Erskine Hejinian, an immigration lawyer, on October 12, 1996. She had two daughters named Marka and Amity born in 2000 and 2001, respectively. Ellertson's mother, Gabriele Ellertson, was from Minneapolis and taught drawing at Macalester College in St. Paul. Her father was Rev. Caroll Ellertson who was a Lutheran minister and missionary in KwaZulu-Natal, South Africa.

Ellertson died on March 21, 2004 from breast cancer.

Charlotte Ellertson Fund 
The Charlotte Ellertson Fund was created in memory of Ellertson after her passing by Ibis's Board of Directors. The fund is used "to provide a source of unrestricted funding that allows Ibis the flexibility to respond quickly to an urgent topic or to focus on a critical organization need with an eye toward Ibis's impact and sustainability."

References

External links 
 Charlotte Ellertson on Google Scholar
 Ibis Reproductive Health

1966 births
2004 deaths
Harvard College alumni
People from Johannesburg
Princeton School of Public and International Affairs alumni
Deaths from breast cancer
American health activists